The music of the American fantasy television series The Lord of the Rings: The Rings of Power is composed by Bear McCreary, with additional music by Howard Shore and other artists. The Amazon Prime Video series is based on the novel The Lord of the Rings and its appendices by J. R. R. Tolkien, and is set in the Second Age of Middle-earth, thousands of years before Tolkien's The Hobbit and The Lord of the Rings. It follows a large cast of characters and covers all the major events of the Second Age.

McCreary was first approached about composing the series' original score in late 2020, and began writing themes or leitmotifs in July 2021. The series is not a continuation of Peter Jackson's The Lord of the Rings and The Hobbit film trilogies and McCreary was contractually prevented from quoting any of the themes that Shore composed for those films, but he hoped to create musical continuity between his score and Shore's. After six weeks composing new themes, McCreary began writing the score for each episode and ultimately composed nine hours of music over eight months. He eschewed the common industry approach of using other composers to write additional music to ensure a consistent musical approach for the whole series. Recording began in November 2021 while McCreary was still composing. The score was recorded with orchestras at Abbey Road Studios and AIR Studios in London and a choir at Synchron Stage in Vienna. The choral music was sung in Tolkien's fictional languages. Soloists were recorded around the world playing various specialty instruments. Recording for the first season was completed in April 2022. Independent of McCreary's work, Shore composed the series' main title theme.

A soundtrack album for the first season was released on August 19, 2022, and was followed by additional albums featuring McCreary's full score for each episode. The score has received positive reviews from critics and several accolades.

Background 
Amazon acquired the global television rights for J. R. R. Tolkien's The Lord of the Rings in November 2017. The company's streaming service, Prime Video, gave a multi-season commitment to a series based on the novel and its appendices, to be produced by Amazon Studios in association with New Line Cinema and in consultation with the Tolkien Estate. J. D. Payne and Patrick McKay were set as showrunners of the series, titled The Lord of the Rings: The Rings of Power, which is set in the Second Age of Middle-earth, thousands of years before Tolkien's The Hobbit and The Lord of the Rings. It follows a large cast of characters and covers all the major events of the Second Age from Tolkien's writings: the forging of the Rings of Power, the rise of the Dark Lord Sauron, the fall of the island kingdom of Númenor, and the last alliance between Elves and Men.

The series was originally expected to be a continuation of Peter Jackson's The Lord of the Rings and The Hobbit film trilogies, but Amazon later clarified that their deal with the Tolkien Estate required them to keep the series distinct from Jackson's films. Despite this, musicians Plan 9—Janet Roddick, David Donaldson, and Steve Roche—and David Long returned from the films to provide music during filming for the first season, as did Howard Shore, who composed the original scores for The Lord of the Rings and The Hobbit. Shore was first reported to be in discussions about working on the series in September 2020. He was said to be interested in developing musical themes but not necessarily composing the entire score. Shore was confirmed to be in talks for the series a year later, when composer Bear McCreary was reported to be involved as well. Their hiring was officially announced in July 2022, with McCreary composing the score and Shore writing the main title theme. McCreary later confirmed that he was contractually prohibited from quoting any themes that Shore wrote for the films.

Original score

Composition 

A long-time fan of Tolkien's writings and Jackson's films, McCreary was first approached about working on the series by executive producer Lindsey Weber, who he worked with on the films 10 Cloverfield Lane (2016) and The Cloverfield Paradox (2018), in 2019. He was not hired until mid-2021 after the COVID-19 pandemic impacted the first season's production and delayed the executive producers' decision on who the composer would be. This meant McCreary had less time than he would have liked to compose the season's score.

Despite not being able to quote any of Shore's material from the films, McCreary wanted to stay true to Shore's approach by preserving the core sounds and styles of music for each culture that Shore had developed. In this way, he hoped to create a "continuity of concept" between Shore's music and his own, with his new themes being added to the "pantheon of memorable melodies" that Shore had written. McCreary said his music for these societies at their peak would naturally progress into Shore's music for the Third Age of Middle-earth, which he called wistful and melancholy. When starting work on the series, McCreary met Shore and they discussed their approaches to writing music. McCreary felt there was an expectation, based on Shore's scores, that the music in the series be a character in and of itself and he wanted to match that by writing music that was less in the background than other modern scores are.

McCreary prefers to see completed footage from a project before composing music for it, but for The Rings of Power he had to begin work based only on the scripts for the first season, conversations with the showrunners, and seeing a rough version of the first two episodes. He felt this worked for the series because, as a fan, he was able to compose themes based on his personal expectations. This meant he was also able to compose themes that would work across the whole series, rather than just the first season, because he already knew the major character arcs. McCreary typically composes three or four themes or leitmotifs for a project, but needed more than 15 for The Rings of Power. He began working on the music in July 2021, starting with "an absolutely brutal six weeks" just composing the themes. He compared this to writing a symphony. McCreary next applied his themes to several key scenes from the first two episodes. He presented these to the showrunners and other executive producers before they heard the individual themes because he wanted their first experience of the music to be in context.

After his themes had been approved by the executive producers, McCreary dedicated most of his time for the next eight months to composing the full nine-hour score for the first season. He only took five days off in that time, and eschewed the common industry practice of using other composers to write additional music. This was to ensure a consistent musical approach for the whole series. Also uncommonly, McCreary did not have spotting sessions with the showrunners after the first two episodes because they all felt that they were already on the same page. He would instead compose and mock-up the full score for each episode and send it to the showrunners, who generally had only a few specific notes for each one. McCreary said it was surreal to have that much freedom and trust on such a big series, which he called "the most ambitious thing that I've ever been attached to. It's a once-in-a-lifetime opportunity, to be able to pour myself into something so profoundly, and be given the space and the creative freedom to do the score I want to hear."

Because he was full-time composing the score, McCreary was unable to orchestrate it himself and relied on his long-time orchestrators Edward Trybek, Henri Wilkinson, and Jonathan Beard to follow notes that he wrote for them. In addition to writing for orchestra and specialist solo instruments, McCreary composed music for choir and solo singers. For these, he used words from Tolkien's fictional languages: the Elvish languages Quenya and Sindarin, the Dwarvish language Khuzdul, the dark language Black Speech, and the Númenórean language Adûnaic. McCreary noted that there is potential to invent new words in some of these languages based on the rules that Tolkien established, but he preferred to stick to words that Tolkien created himself. He started by referring to a dictionary of words and phrases for each language while he was composing, and then worked with Brian Claeys from his production company to make sure the text fit the music. Payne reviewed all of the text in the score to ensure each fictional language was being used correctly, something that McCreary was amazed by and grateful for considering Payne's busy schedule as showrunner. Finally, the series' dialect coach, Leith McPhearson, recorded herself pronouncing every line of text phonetically, syllable by syllable, so the choir and soloists could learn the correct pronunciation of each word ahead of recording. McCreary felt the amount of work put into getting the languages correct for the score was a testament to how much the crew cared about the source material.

After McCreary finished composing the score for the first season, he spent six to eight weeks creating soundtrack albums, participated in marketing for the series, and then spent September 2022 writing blog entries that explain his score for each episode in-depth. The day after he finished writing the blogs, which he considered to be the end of his work on the first season, McCreary received scripts for the second season. He began composing new music by November, including music that was needed during filming, and expressed excitement at being involved in the season from the beginning and being able to pace out his work better than on the first season.

Leitmotifs 
Writing all of the themes or leitmotifs for the series and ensuring they were distinct and memorable required "every skill [McCreary] had ever learned" throughout his career. His approach was to use a unique set of specialty instruments for each theme on top of the orchestra and choir, and he chose a different starting interval so they would all be identifiable by their first two notes. He wrote an "anthem" for each culture that the character themes could either align with or not, depending on the characterization, to "clearly express each theme's narrative intention". McCreary wrote an A section, a B section, and an introduction for each theme.

Themes for Elves 
 "Valinor":McCreary's theme for Valinor, the Elves' "homeland" across the sea, represents Elven culture in the series. He wanted it to be the music that Elves sing as they sail into Valinor, but the scene where that happens in the first episode had already been filmed by the time he was hired. The actors were singing a song by Plan 9 that McCreary felt did not work as a theme for Valinor, and therefore the Valinor theme that he did write for the series needed to match the mouth movements in the scene. McCreary worked with the editing team for a month to perfect this. He retained Shore's approach to the Elves of focusing on "ethereal light vocals", and tried to create a sense of longing with techniques such as a chord that is "a tritone away from the tonic [meaning it] is as far away as the chord can possibly be... it feels like it's out of reach".
 "Galadriel":McCreary said the series was primarily told from Galadriel's perspective and he wanted to give her a memorable, powerful melody that could be used often. Like many of his heroic themes, Galadriel's begins with an upward motion (in this case a minor seventh interval). It then descends and rises several times to create the feeling that she is searching, representing her hunt for Sauron. Her theme has an "aggressive propulsion" related to the hunt that makes it an outlier among the music for the Elves, and McCreary designed her theme to combine easily with Sauron's because she is often thinking about him and her desire for justice.
 "Elrond Half-elven":The theme that McCreary had the most difficulty writing for the first season was Elrond's. His initial theme was inspired by the authoritative character from the books and films, but the executive producers did not notice there was an Elrond theme at first and felt he "wasn't sure what to say" with it. After discussing the character with them, McCreary saw an optimistic outsider struggling with the legacy of his family and wrote a woodwind and string melody that captured his "innocence, naïveté, and optimism". The theme moves between a major key and a minor key as if it "doesn't quite know whether it's happy or sad".

For the introductions of the Elven capital Lindon and High King Gil-galad, McCreary chose to use Elrond's theme. He did not do this to suggest that Elrond represented Elves in-general, but because he wanted the audience to focus on Elrond's character in those scenes. He did have a specific theme for Gil-galad planned but did not use it during the first season.

Themes for Dwarves 
 "Khazad-dûm":McCreary retained Shore's approach of deep male vocals singing in the Dwarvish language Khuzdul, but was able to differentiate his theme from Shore's work because the series explores the Dwarves at their peak compared to the "sad, noble, displaced people in diaspora" of the films. McCreary wrote a patriotic anthem with a "churning" string pattern and anvils being hit with metal hammers. The introduction of Khazad-dûm was one of the first scenes McCreary scored, and the executive producers had no notes on it which led McCreary to say "the Dwarven music is very much in my DNA". This theme is also associated with King Durin III.
 "Durin IV":Prince Durin IV's theme shares traits with "Khazad-dûm", but McCreary said it had more "warmth, intimacy, [and] even a little comedy", with "a layer of jovial, almost jaunty personality". He did feel there was a nobility to the music that avoided becoming comedic relief. For example, he contrasted the introduction of Durin's wife Disa (using a cello and fiddle) with a noble French horn for the tree that Elrond gave to Durin.

Themes for Low Men 
 "The Southlands":McCreary said the Low Men of Middle-earth were represented by the people of Rohan in the films, and Shore primarily used the hardanger fiddle from Norway for their music. McCreary used the same instrument for the Low Men of the Second Age, represented by the people of the Southlands, but differentiated his music by using it in a lower register and combining it with another Nordic stringed instrument, the nyckelharpa.
 "Bronwyn and Arondir":McCreary was unhappy with his initial version of the love theme for the human Bronwyn and Elf Arondir and re-wrote it after finishing the other themes. He wanted it to represent "yearning and attraction, but also sadness". Inspired by Nino Rota's score for Romeo and Juliet (1968) and the music of Dmitri Shostakovich, Samuel Barber, and John Williams, McCreary gave the theme repeated upward leaps to create a sense of longing.
 "Halbrand":To set-up the reveal that Halbrand is Sauron in disguise, McCreary wrote his theme so playing it backwards or inverting the musical notes would turn it into Sauron's theme. However, he felt this made the connection too obvious so he adjusted Halbrand's theme to be in a major key rather than a minor key. He also differentiated the two by using the instruments of the Southlands' theme for Halbrand, and hoped the audience would immediately focus on the character's connection to the Southlands. Because McCreary's theme for Sauron does not have any big intervals between notes, differentiating it from his heroic themes, Halbrand's theme was the only "heroic" theme in the score to also not have any big intervals, so McCreary wrote a B theme for the character that does have larger intervals as a way to further hide the connection.

Themes for High Men 
 "Númenor":Because the island kingdom of Númenor does not exist during the time of the films, McCreary wanted to represent it with music that is not found in Shore's scores. He compared the culture to past civilizations in the real world that no longer exist, such as Ancient Egypt and Babylon, and decided to use Middle Eastern frame drums, Indian dhol drums, Armenian duduk woodwinds, and a Turkish yaylı tambur string instrument. He also focused on the brass section in the traditional European orchestra as an allusion to Arthurian legends. This theme also represents the character Pharazôn, and begins to be used in darker ways in the first season's second half.
 "Elendil and Isildur":This theme differentiates the characters Elendil and Isildur from the other Númenoreans, and is also used for the White Tree of Númenor. McCreary intended this to become the theme for the Faithful Númenoreans when the society becomes divided between those who are still friends to Elves and the "King's Men" who are not (and continue to be represented by the main "Númenor" theme). Isildur is introduced with the theme played on a rustic fiddle while Elendil is represented by brass instruments. The second half of the theme is not used during the first season, because it was written in anticipation of later seasons when Elendil and Isildur are part of the last alliance between Elves and Men. McCreary wanted to make sure the "plaintive and wistful" theme would still work at that point, when it would need to be "tragic, operatic, [and] soaring".

Themes for Harfoots 
 "Harfoot Life":Representing the nomadic lifestyle of the secretive Harfoots, "Harfoot Life" is in the "off kilter"  time signature which McCreary compared to "a cart wheel that has a bump in it, and it's just rolling along". Because the Harfoots are the predecessors of the Hobbits from the films, McCreary wanted his music to be able to evolve into the Celtic-inspired music that Shore wrote for the Hobbits. The Harfoot theme therefore uses Celtic instruments: Scottish bagpipes, and Irish uilleann pipes, bodhrán drums, and penny whistles. McCreary added African balafon percussion that sound like instruments the Harfoots could make out of logs picked up while traveling. He explained that these sounds would be abandoned in the future when the Harfoots settle down in the Shire, at which point Shore's more orchestral Hobbit music would become more appropriate.
This means instead having repeated small intervals like "Harfoot Life", "Nori Brandyfoot" has bigger leaps that suggest she is not satisfied living a regular Harfoot life and is looking outward and upward. McCreary actually wrote Nori's theme before he settled on the Harfoot approach and had to add elements of "Harfoot Life" into his Nori theme, including an opening ostinato on wooden percussion, to ensure she still had the "Harfoot color".

Themes for Orcs 
 "Nampat":This track combines McCreary's themes for the Orcs and their leader, Adar. To represent the Orcs, McCreary created a "screaming, weird, otherworldly texture" using drums and woodwind instruments made from bones such as antlers and femurs. He also used conch shells and Aztec death whistles. He described this as more of a "musical cloud" than a theme, differentiating it from the rest of the series' themes, including Sauron's. In contrast, Adar's theme has a melody. This is heard in "Nampat" on brass instruments but is often played in the series on a combination of Japanese shakuhachi and Chinese dizi flutes. McCreary included several references to Garry Schyman's score for the video game Middle-earth: Shadow of Mordor (2014) in his Orc theme, saying it was his favorite The Lord of the Rings music outside of the film and television adaptations.

Themes for other characters 
 "Sauron":Sauron's theme combines an ostinato in  time with a melody in  time to indicate the character's twisted and uneven nature. It includes a choir chanting in Black Speech, using words from the inscription on the One Ring because Tolkien did not provide many other Black Speech words in his writings. McCreary said the chanting sounded louder than he originally intended, and "so evil", and stated that Tolkien's books "implied that when you speak in Black Apeech, an evil cloud fills the room... and that happened!" McCreary also used this theme to represent Sauron's predecessor, the Dark Lord Morgoth, who is only briefly shown in the series.
 "The Stranger":The theme for the mysterious stranger who crashes into Middle-earth does not share any music ideas with the series' cultural themes to reflect that his origin is unknown. The theme always starts with the sounds of an Indonesian gamelan percussion ensemble, and a major seventh interval that McCreary said was rare for modern popular music. He stated that the theme is "both major and minor, both heroic and twisted" to add to the mystery of the character. McCreary did not ask who the character was specifically when he began writing the theme, but did ask if he would be a hero or villain. Because he knew the character would be heroic at the end of the first season, McCreary was able to make the theme more ominous at the beginning which was inspired by the scores for E.T. the Extra-Terrestrial (1982) and The Iron Giant (1999).

Other themes 

 "The Lord of the Rings: The Rings of Power Main Title":The series' main title theme, composed by Howard Shore, was created independently of McCreary's score. McCreary first heard it when he was around halfway through composing the music for the first season and he said it was a "wonderful fanfare for our show" that lived up to his expectations. He described it as "beautiful and noble" and said it made him nostalgic for Jackson's films, while also fitting "so beautifully" with his own score for the series.
 "Where the Shadows Lie":This song was composed by McCreary using the text of the "Ring Verse" from Tolkien's The Lord of the Rings, and he used it as a theme for the Rings of Power, the magic of mithril, Sauron's machinations, and the dark land of Mordor. McCreary said it combined a "haunting melody" with Tolkien's ominous text. It is first heard over the opening title card of the first episode, is played in full without lyrics over that episode's end credits, and is used multiple times in the score for each episode. It is first heard with lyrics during the first-season finale's end credits. The lyrics were withheld until then to not spoil the theme's meaning during the earlier episodes, though McCreary did reveal that there was a theme for the Rings of Power in his score before the song was released.

Additionally, McCreary used the "overblown woodwind effect" of a Japanese shakuhachi flute as a recurring sound in the score to signify the presence of wolves.

Recording and mixing 
Because of the series' large budget, McCreary was given the resources he needed to record the score how he wanted without having to use common television cost-saving techniques such as alternating between bigger and smaller orchestras. Recording for the score began in November 2021, and each episode used a 90-piece orchestra at either Abbey Road Studios or AIR Studios in London over four days, a 40-person choir and children's choir at Synchron Stage in Vienna over three or fours days, and soloists on various specialty instruments in Los Angeles, New York, Norway, and Sweden over seven days. Because of limits on the number of performers allowed together during the COVID-19 pandemic, the orchestra was split into strings, woodwind and brass, and percussion for separate recording sessions. McCreary supervised the various recording sessions remotely while continuing to compose the score, with Gavin Greenaway, Cliff Masterson, and Anthony Weeden conducting the orchestra instead. Gottfried Rabl and Bernhard Melbye Voss conducted the choirs.

The different recordings were mixed together by Jason LaRocca to sound like they were all recorded together. By the end of 2021, the music was being added to the final sound mix for each episode. This was done on a schedule comparable to a feature film, giving time for McCreary to work with each episode's editors, sound designer Robby Stambler, and sound mixers Lindsey Alvarez and Beau Borders until they were all happy with the sound mix for each episode. McCreary said this was the first time in his career that he was able to give input on a sound mix before a showrunner's involvement. Working on the music mixes, supervising recordings, and still composing all of the music himself had a large toll on McCreary's physical and mental wellbeing, but he chose to continue composing the entire score himself because he wanted to realize the "full extent of [his] vision" and because writing music for The Lord of the Rings was a lifelong dream of his. McCreary finished composing the score in April 2022, and was able to conduct the orchestra for the final episode himself at AIR Studios that month.

Soloists that were recorded on specialty instruments for the first season include Paul Jacob Cartwright playing fiddle, McCreary's longtime collaborator Eric Rigler playing bagpipes and Irish whistles, Bruce Carver playing bodhrán drums, Olav Luksengård Mjelva playing the hardanger fiddle, Erik Rydvall playing nyckelharpa, McCreary's close friend Malachai Bandy playing the yaylı tambur and viola da gamba, Zac Zinger playing the shakuhachi flute, and William Roper creating the Orcs' music with horns of war, ceremonial shells, antlers, femur flutes, and Aztec death whistles. Violinist Sandy Cameron performed the solos for "Scherzo for Violin and Swords" and the instrumental version of "Where the Shadows Lie" while Eric Byers provided cello solos. Vocal soloists included Sladja Raicevic, child soprano Laura Maier, and McCreary's wife Raya Yarbrough.

Songs and diegetic music 
Plan 9 and David Long wrote eight pieces of music for use on the first season's set, including diegetic music for the streets of Númenor. The series includes several on-screen songs which McCreary was happy to see, believing that it was a key part of Tolkien's writings and helped show the different cultures of Middle-earth. Plan 9 wrote the melody for the song "This Wandering Day", with lyrics by showrunner J. D. Payne. McCreary arranged and orchestrated the song, which is sung by actress Megan Richards in-character as the Harfoot Poppy Proudfoot during the episode "Partings". Plan 9's Janet Roddick also sung a version of the song that is heard during the episode's end credits. A version of the song "Where the Shadows Lie", which McCreary wrote as a theme for the score, is heard during the end credits of the first-season finale featuring singer Fiona Apple.

For the second season, McCreary was able to contribute to the music needed during filming because he was already involved in the production from the start.

Release

Singles 
Two singles from the first season's score were released at the same time McCreary was announced as composer for the series:

Albums 
McCreary produced a first-season album featuring his main themes as well as highlights from each episode. He edited, re-wrote, and re-recorded most of the music to create "an emotional listening experience that captures the season's narrative arc in a symphonic format", and to remove some spoilers because the album was released before the episodes were. This included the version of "Where the Shadows Lie" featuring Fiona Apple which was added to the album after all the episodes were released. McCreary also released individual albums after each episode debuted, containing "virtually every second of score" from each episode.

Reception

Critical response 
Zanobard Reviews wrote "while many of McCreary’s new themes are indeed amazing and very memorable, some are sadly a bit less so, with a few blending into each other to the point where they are rather difficult to identify and separate at times, which does dampen the whole “orchestral tapestry” thing a tad. Howard Shore’s brief contribution to The Rings Of Power is also a bit of a disappointment, as a singular and rather forgettable ninety second cue just isn’t enough to make any meaningful impact on the score, no matter how LOTR-y it may sound. Bear McCreary does channel a little bit of Shore in his compositional style (particularly in the more Elven moments) but the music here is certainly and identifiably McCreary’s, which will please some, and heavily displease others [...] the composer does seem to just give it his enthusiastic all here, to some seriously impressive musical results overall which honestly is all we can really ask for. In essence then; if you’re coming here expecting the second coming of Howard Shore’s Lord Of The Rings and all the iconic music that would entail, you are going to be disappointed. If you’re here with just the expectations of a solid fantasy score, a couple of decent themes and a good orchestral time though; you’ll be utterly blown away by how good this is."

Thomas Bacon of Screen Rant wrote "The Lord of the Rings: The Rings of Power soundtrack to date is absolutely stunning, perfectly complementing the lavish cinematography and remarkable special effects. Shore's theme is stylistically evocative of Peter Jackson's classic The Lord of the Rings movies (likely the reason he was hired in the first place). McCreary, meanwhile, is a skilled composer whose own personal style has been heavily influenced by Shore's work, making him a perfect thematic match. At the same time, though, his music is subtly different - in keeping with the Second Age setting of The Rings of Power, which deals with a very different version of Middle-earth." Writing on the "Khazad-dûm" theme, Bacon said "it is one of the most striking themes, with thunderous drums and deep chants to present the Mines of Moria before the Dwarven kingdom's downfall", and "Nori Brandyfoot" called that the theme "is evocative of the Hobbits, but with (appropriately enough) a far more adventurous feel." He concluded "McCreary's score doesn't quite live up to Shore's, but frankly it was never going to. Still, it is remarkably impressive and serves as a testimony to the composer's real skill and talent."

Sophia Alexandra Hall of Classic FM, called the score as "a mystical musical return to middle earth". Juliette Harrisson of Den of Geek had reviewed the score "McCreary’s Celtic-flavored composition is the perfect continuation of Shore’s work". Ben Sledge of The Gamer "Composer Bear McCreary has created a soundtrack with shades of the Ainulindalë". Alicie Rose Dodds of Game Rant said "If Shore’s Middle Earth was one of melancholy and the wistful crumbling of one great race, then McCreary’s Middle Earth is one that speaks loudly of the might of these cultures at the pinnacle of their power. His music plays like the predecessor to Shore’s, like the music of mighty people before they fell to sickness, greed, and ruin. The best comparison is that Shore’s music is like the faded and often crumbling frescos of a church, still mighty, beautiful, and powerful, but lacking the color and vibrancy of when it was first created."

The main theme to Rings of the Power, written by Howard Shore, was nearly streamed over 117,000 times in Spotify, while the themes "Galadriel" and "Khazad-dûm" streamed over 100,000 times.

Accolades

Additional music 
McCreary was asked to compose original music for the series' title announcement video that was released in January 2022, for which he used his "The Stranger" theme. Later in 2022, Amazon asked McCreary to perform live with an orchestra at San Diego Comic-Con. He combined the tracks "Nolwa Mahtar", "Galadriel", "Sauron", and "The Stranger" into an overture for choir, orchestra, percussion, and solo violinist Sandy Cameron.

See also 
 Music of The Lord of the Rings film series
 Music of The Hobbit film series

References

External links 
 Bear McCreary's blogs about the creation of the first season's score: The Lord of the Rings: Appendices Part 1, Appendices Part 2, Appendices Part 3, and Appendices Part 4

2022 soundtrack albums
Music based on The Lord of the Rings
Soundtrack